Brynmawr Foundation School is a secondary school in Brynmawr, Blaenau Gwent, Wales.

Academic performance
In 2016, 98% of pupils entered achieved at least 5 grades A* to C at GCSE level.

3G Multi-purpose sports pitch

A new 3G multi-purpose sports pitch has been officially opened at Brynmawr Foundation School by Wales & Dragons rugby star Elliot Dee.

The pitch is the result of an investment of over half a million pounds, thanks to partnership working between the school; Blaenau Gwent Council and Welsh sport agencies.

References

[] Blaenau Gwent Council article 3G pitch

External links
 The school's website: https://www.brynmawrfoundationschool.co.uk/

Secondary schools in Blaenau Gwent